Esdilasas was a Moorish tribal leader active during the rebellion in the province of Byzacena. In 534 and 535, he was among the Moorish leaders who rebelled against Byzantine authority in Africa. In late 534, he, along with the Berber tribal leaders Cutzinas, Iurfutes and Medisiníssas, defeated the Byzantine officers Aigan and Rufinus. In 535, however, the rebels were defeated by the Byzantine military commander Solomon, first at Mammes, then at Bourgaon. In the aftermath of Bourgaon, Esdilasas surrendered and was taken to Carthage.

References

Sources 
 

6th-century Berber people
6th-century rulers in Africa
Berber rulers
Byzacena
Berber rebels
Rebellions against the Byzantine Empire
Byzantine rebels